Hovhannes Setian (1853 Constantinople, Ottoman Empire - 1930 Cairo, Egypt), was an Armenian short story writer, poet, and teacher.

Biography 
Setian was born in Constantinople in 1853. He studied at local schools and soon thereafter became a teacher. In 1896, Setian escaped the Armenian massacres and settled in Cairo, Egypt where he remained the rest of his life.

Poetry 

Setian belonged to a particular poetry movement within the Armenian literary scene of the 19th century that conflicted with realist and romantic themes of writing. He was on the borderline of that conflict, however he was more inclined to the romantic style.

Setian wrote many volumes of poetry, including Գրական զբօսանք (Literary Leisure, 1882), Յուզման ժամեր (Hours of Emotion, 1888), Բլուրն ի վեր (Up the Hill, 1896), and Տարագրին քնարը (The Lyre of an Emigre, 1912). His short stories and prose writing, collected in a volume called Արշալոյսէն վերջալոյսի (From Dawn till Dusk, 1912), were published in Cairo.

References 

Armenians from the Ottoman Empire
Emigrants from the Ottoman Empire to Egypt
20th-century Armenian poets
1853 births
1930 deaths
Writers from Istanbul
Armenian male poets
20th-century male writers